Voleti voleti (trans: To Love to Love) is the eleventh studio album from Serbian and former Yugoslav rock band Galija.

Track listing
All the songs were written by Nenad Milosavljević (music) and Slobodan Kostadinović (lyrics).
"Pege" – 4:17
"Kaća" – 4:00
"Pismo" – 4:55
"Bluz za Velikog Majstora" – 4:23
"Milica" - 5:55
"Kotor" – 3:49
"Ko bi drugi" – 3:50
"Beg" – 5:13
"Niš" – 3:31
"Jabukovac" – 5:42

Personnel
Nenad Milosavljević - vocals, acoustic guitar, harmonica
Predrag Milosavljević - vocals
Dragutin Jakovljević - guitar
Oliver Jezdić - keyboards
Branislav Milošević - bass guitar
Boban Pavlović - drums

References 
 EX YU ROCK enciklopedija 1960-2006,  Janjatović Petar;  

Galija albums
1997 albums
PGP-RTS albums